The Mobilco Tournament was a golf tournament held at Cottesloe Golf Club in Western Australia. It was held just once, in August 1952, and was won by Peter Thomson. Total prize money was £2,000. The sponsor was Mobilco Machinery, an Australian farm machinery manufacturer.

Winners

References

Golf tournaments in Australia